The South Branch Machias River is a  river in Aroostook County, Maine. From the outflow of Center Pond in Maine Township 10, Range 8, WELS, the river runs east to its confluence with the Machias River in  T.10 R.7 WELS. Via the Machias and Aroostook rivers, it is part of the Saint John River watershed.

See also
List of rivers of Maine

References

Maine Streamflow Data from the USGS
Maine Watershed Data From Environmental Protection Agency

External links 

Rivers of Aroostook County, Maine